Jordan Jacott (March 14, 1994), better known by his stage name Dopebwoy, is a Dutch rapper. Well known among other things from his number 1 single Guap in the Dutch Single Top 100.

Career 
In April 2017, Dopebwoy released his debut album under the name Nieuw Goud, which reached 36th place in the Dutch Album Top 100. With the song Cartier, which Dopebwoy released in June 2017 together with Chivv and 3robi, he had his first hit as the song remained in the top 10 of the chart for 12 weeks. In the years that followed, Dopebwoy made several songs and collaborated with artists such as Jayh, Bizzey and Boef.

In the spring of 2020, Dopebwoy started his own label under the name Forever Lit Records, in collaboration with Warner Music Benelux. In April 2020 he released his song Christian Dior as the first song under this label. The album Hoog Seizoen soon followed, which reached 3rd place in the Dutch Album Top 100. In 2021 Dopebwoy released the single Erop Eraf, which achieved gold status.

Discography

Albums

Singles

References 

Dutch rappers
1994 births
Living people